The Dutch Basketball League's (DBL) blocks title is awarded to the player with the highest blocks per game average in a given regular season.

Leaders

References

External links
Blocks leaders DBL at j-dus.com 

blocks